The Gounamitz River is a tributary of the head of the Restigouche River, flowing in the Northwest of New Brunswick, in Canada.

The course of Gounamitz river crosses:
 Madawaska County: Rivière-Verte, Sainte-Anne Parish
 Restigouche County: Saint-Quentin Parish;
 Victoria County: Drummond Parish.

Geography 

The Gounamitz River rises at the confluence of the North Branch Gounamitz River and West Branch Gounamitz River. This source is located in the Rivière-Verte Parish, in Madawaska County.

This source is located at:
  South of the southern boundary of the Saint-Quentin Parish;
  East of the confluence of Lake First;
  Southwest of the confluence of the Little Main Restigouche River which is the head of the Restigouche River;
  Northwest from the confluence of the Gounamitz river;
  East of the southern boundary of the Quebec.

Gounamitz river flows in forest zone, more or less in parallel in the southwest side to the Kedgwick River.

  Eastward in the Rivière-Verte Parish, (Madawaska County) up to Cyr stream (from the West);
  Eastward up to Dave Richards Brook (from the West);
  Eastward to the edge of the Saint-Quentin (Restigouche County);
  to the East in the Saint-Quentin up to "Balm of Gilead Brooke" (from the West);
  to the Southeast, up to Big Brook (from the West);
  to the Southeast receiving the waters of Falls Brook (from the Southwest) to the boundary of the Sainte-Anne Parish;
  to the southeast, to the limit of the Drummond Parish (Victoria County, New Brunswick);
 . To the south east, to the confluence of the Gounamitz River 

The "Gounamitz River" pours on the Northwest shore of the Little Main Restigouche River, in the Drummond Parish, Victoria County, New Brunswick.

The confluence of the "Gounamitz River" is located at:
  Southwest of the confluence of the Kedgwick River and Little Main Restigouche River;
  West of the village center of Saint-Quentin;
  Southwest of the village center of Kedgwick;
  East of downtown of Edmundston;
  Southwest of the Campbellton, New Brunswick bridge, crossing the Restigouche River.

See also 

 Restigouche County
 Victoria County, New Brunswick
 List of rivers of New Brunswick
 Gulf of Saint Lawrence
 Restigouche River
 Little Main Restigouche River
 North Branch Gounamitz River
 West Branch Gounamitz River
 Rivière-Verte Parish
 Saint-Quentin Parish
 Saint-Quentin Parish
 Drummond Parish

References

External links 

 Website: Restigouche.org - Watershed Management Council of the Restigouche River Inc. - Restigouche River Watershed Management Council Inc.

Rivers of New Brunswick
Canadian Heritage Rivers